Scooby-Doo! and the Legend of the Vampire is a 2003 American direct-to-video animated adventure film, and the fifth in a series of direct-to-video films based upon the Scooby-Doo Saturday morning cartoons. It was completed in 2002, and released on March 4, 2003 and it was produced by Warner Bros. Animation, but included a copyright for Hanna-Barbera Cartoons, Inc..

It is the first Scooby-Doo direct-to-video film to have the flatter, bright animation style of the What's New, Scooby-Doo? series, departing from the darker shading and effects used in the four prior released films, the first to return to the original format where the monster is not real and the first to return to a lighter tone than that of the prior and darker Scooby made-for-video films.

This film served as Joseph Barbera's first solo animated production effort without longtime partner William Hanna (who died on March 22, 2001, due to throat cancer) and is one of two direct-to-video films to reunite the surviving classic 1969–73 voice cast consisting of Frank Welker, Casey Kasem, Nicole Jaffe, and Heather North. Since Don Messick (the original voice of Scooby) died on October 24, 1997, Welker provides Scooby's voice (in addition to voicing Fred Jones).

Plot
Scooby-Doo and the Mystery Inc. gang have arrived in Australia for a vacation. After seeing various sights throughout Sydney, the gang decides to go to the outback and see the music festival at Vampire Rock. When they arrive, they meet the Hex Girls (the band the gang had met before in Scooby-Doo! and the Witch's Ghost and have since become close friends with). They also meet the managers of the show, Daniel and Russell, and Daniel's eccentric grandfather, Malcolm, who is against the festival and warns Daniel about what has happened and drives off. Daniel tells them that most of the performers have left because Matt Marvelous was kidnapped by vampires. Daniel and Russell tell them about Wildwind, a musical group who performed last year. It is believed that the members of Wildwind - Dark Skull, Stormy Weather, and Lightning Strikes - have been turned into vampires by the Yowie Yahoo, a vampire who lives in Vampire Rock.

Fred decides the best way to solve the mystery is to enter the contest as a band to drive the Yowie Yahoo to capture them. While they are practicing (not very well), a golf cart approaches them driven by Jasper Ridgeway, and his band, the Bad Omens, King, Queen and Jack. The gang learns that Jasper was once the manager of Wildwind and grows suspicious of him, thinking he might have put his band up to masquerading as vampires and getting rid of the other performers to win. They split up, with Fred, Velma and Daphne going to Jasper's trailer and Shaggy and Scooby staying at the food stands.

At the trailer, Fred, Velma and Daphne find that Jasper has mementos of Wildwind, including the old stage costumes. They also wonder why Jasper did not come to his trailer (revealed he was trying to get the Hex Girls sign him as their manager after Wildwind) when he said he was going to. Meanwhile, Scooby and Shaggy get chased by the Wildwind Vampires and eventually lose them. They end up back at the stage, where the Bad Omens are rehearsing, witnessing the vampires capture them the same way they captured Matt Marvelous. Fred decides that everyone should sleep at the same place, so no one gets taken. During the festival, the Yowie Yahoo and Wildwind appear and capture the Hex Girls, leading the gang to chase them into the caves.

Inside, Fred, Velma and Daphne find the Wildwind vampires and get chased. Scooby and Shaggy get trapped by a group of dingoes. The sound of Fred, Velma and Daphne running scares off the Dingoes, but then the gang gets trapped by the vampires. They avoid them until the sun comes up, which destroys Yowie Yahoo but Wildwind are not affected by the sun or water, and chase the gang until they and Daniel trap them. The gang reveals the Two Skinny Dudes, a band they met prior, and Russell. Daniel and Jasper are surprised, and get even more so when it is shown that the Skinny Dudes and Russell are really the members of Wildwind in masks. They explain how they wanted to start up their career and were planning to perform again. However, when they realized that they were not allowed to, they disguised themselves as vampires, and sabotaged the other performers so they may make a 'miraculous comeback'. The Yowie Yahoo was just a hologram. When asked about the missing performers, they said they sent them away on free Great Barrier Reef Scuba diving tours except for the Hex Girls, who were dumped in the Outback when they refused to play along.

The members of Wildwind are arrested and Daniel realizes that since all the other bands are out of the competition, that makes Scooby and the gang the winners by default. The film ends with the gang performing to the cheering crowd and getting their band name, the Meddling Kids, joined by the Hex Girls.

Voice cast
 Frank Welker as Scooby-Doo and Fred
 Casey Kasem as Shaggy
 Nicole Jaffe as Velma
 Heather North as Daphne
 Phil LaMarr as Daniel Illiwara and King
 Jeff Bennett as Jasper Ridgeway, Jack and Lifeguard #1
 Kevin Michael Richardson as Malcolm Illiwara, the Yowie Yahoo 
 Jennifer Hale as Thorn and Queen
 Jane Wiedlin as Dusk
 Kimberly Brooks as Luna
 Michael Neill as Russell/Dark Skull and Matt Marvelous
 Tom Kenny as Harry/Stormy Weathers, Barry/Lightning Strikes and Lifeguard #2

References

External links

 
 

2003 animated films
2003 direct-to-video films
2003 films
2000s American animated films
American mystery films
American direct-to-video films
Films set in Australia
Warner Bros. Animation animated films
Warner Bros. direct-to-video animated films
Scooby-Doo direct-to-video animated films
Vampires in animated film
American children's animated adventure films
American children's animated mystery films
American children's animated comedy films
2000s children's animated films
2000s English-language films
Films directed by Scott Jeralds